Troxochrota is a genus of sheet weavers that was first described by C. Chyzer & Władysław Kulczyński in 1894.

Species
 it contains only two species.
Troxochrota kashmirica (Caporiacco, 1935) – Kashmir
Troxochrota scabra Kulczyński, 1894 – Central and northern Europe, Russia (Europe)

See also
 List of Linyphiidae species (Q–Z)

References

Araneomorphae genera
Linyphiidae
Spiders of Asia